This is a list of official football games played by Syria national football team between 2000 and 2009.

2000

2001

2002

2003

2004

2005

2006

2007

2008

2009

References

External links 
 Syria national football team

2000
2000s in Syrian sport